Branko "Bane" Radaković (26 January 1982 – 4 November 2018) was a Serbian actor, director, rock musician, painter.

Biography

He graduated elementary school and high school Gymnasium in Paraćin. In 2005, he  graduated  at  the Belgrade's Academy of Applied  Art.  Radaković  was a  teacher of   art  in  elementary school in  Bač Serbia. In  2015, Radaković  released  a critically acclaimed documentary "Limunovog Drvo". He wrote a  book  of poetry, "Trag koji  ostaje".
He  died  on 4 November 2018 in Bač aged 36. He was  interred  at the  Orthodox Christian  cemetery in Bač.

Filmography

 Time (2007)
 Unavailable freedom (2007)
 Roadway for life that doesn't exist (2007)
 Passing time (2007)
 Memory (2007)
 Waves (2007)
 A trip to Europe (2007)
 Autumn (2007)
 Face of truth (2007)
 Freedom and performance (2008)
 The Reportion about two artists (2009)
 The Bridge of love (2009)
 The Illusion (2009)
 The Hidden projection (2009)
 The Divided Serbia (2009)
 This is not a movie (2010)
 The shortest movie in the world (2010)
 Without a good title for now and without politicians, as well (2010)
 The word of God among people (2010)
 Good-bye to video tapes! (2010)
 Smoking (2011)
 Nature (2011)
 Exist (2011)
 Dream (2011)
 Once Upon a Time in Paracin (2011)
 The Tourist (2012)
 I have to do that (2012)
 Winter (2012)
 Views (2013)
 Culture is booming (2013)

References

External links
 

Serbian male film actors
Serbian film directors
Serbian artists
Serbian rock musicians
2018 deaths
People from Paraćin
1982 births